Paul Darby (born October 22, 1956) is an American former football wide receiver who played in the National Football League (NFL) for the New York Jets from 1979 to 1980.

References

living people
1956 births
New York Jets players
players of American football from Texas
American football wide receivers
Texas State Bobcats football players